Birger Andersson (2 November 1925 – 28 December 2004) was a Finnish rower. He competed in the men's eight event at the 1952 Summer Olympics.

References

1925 births
2004 deaths
Finnish male rowers
Olympic rowers of Finland
Rowers at the 1952 Summer Olympics
Sportspeople from Turku